The 1952 Italian Grand Prix was a Formula Two race held on 7 September 1952 at Monza. It was the eighth and final round of the 1952 World Championship of Drivers, in which each Grand Prix was run to Formula Two rules rather than the Formula One regulations normally used. The 80-lap race was won by Ferrari driver Alberto Ascari after he started from pole position. José Froilán González finished second for the Maserati team and Ascari's teammate Luigi Villoresi came in third.

Race report 
Due to the dominance of the Ferrari team throughout 1952, the World Drivers' Championship had already been clinched a month prior to the season-ending Italian Grand Prix. Nevertheless, Ferrari entered five drivers for their home race, with their Dutch Grand Prix trio—World Champion Alberto Ascari, Nino Farina and Luigi Villoresi—being joined by Piero Taruffi and André Simon, both of whom had competed for the Scuderia at various points of the season. There were also a number of privateer Ferraris, including the Ecurie Espadon pairing of Fischer and Stuck, as well as Charles de Tornaco of Ecurie Francorchamps, Louis Rosier and Peter Whitehead. The works Maserati team appeared for the first and only time in the 1952 World Championship, running three cars for Felice Bonetto, Franco Rol and José Froilán González. Also running A6GCMs were the Escuderia Bandeirantes trio of Bianco, Cantoni and Landi, while Enrico Platé's drivers—Toulo de Graffenried and debutant Alberto Crespo—ran the older 4CLT/48 equipped with the team's own revised engines. Gordini retained their previous driver lineup of Behra, Manzon and Trintignant, while Johnny Claes drove a privateer Simca-Gordini at Monza. HWM entered a pair of cars for Peter Collins and Lance Macklin, with Australian Tony Gaze running a privateer HWM. The Connaught team, absent since the British Grand Prix, returned to the Championship with a three-car entry consisting of Stirling Moss (who had driven for ERA at the previous event), Dennis Poore and Kenneth McAlpine.

For this event, only 24 cars were allowed to take the start, meaning that 11 of the 35 drivers who had entered the race failed to qualify. These included all of the HWMs, three of the privateer Ferraris, and both of the Enrico Platé-entered Maseratis. Ascari took his third consecutive pole position (and his fifth of the season), and the front row was completed by his teammates Villoresi and Farina, and the Gordini of Trintignant. The Maserati of González started from the second row, alongside the remaining works Ferraris of Taruffi and Simon, and the Gordini of Robert Manzon. Row three consisted of Stirling Moss in the leading Connaught, Frenchman Élie Bayol in the sole OSCA, Behra in the third and final works Gordini, and Mike Hawthorn in his privateer Cooper-Bristol. The remaining works Maseratis of Bonetto and Rol were only able to make the fourth row of the grid, starting from 13th and 16th, respectively.

José Froilán González emerged in first place at the start of the race, ahead of Ascari in second. The Argentine remained in the lead for the first 36 laps of the race, until a slow pit stop allowed the Ferraris of Ascari and Villoresi to pass him for first and second, respectively. Ascari held the lead for the remainder of the race, and, in so doing, took his sixth consecutive World Championship race victory. González caught up with Villoresi and passed him to take second place in his only Championship race of the season. Villoresi completed the podium by taking his second consecutive third-place finish. Farina was not far behind in fourth place, while the second Maserati of Felice Bonetto took the final points position in fifth, finishing a lap down on the leaders. The remaining works Ferraris of Simon and Taruffi finished in sixth and seventh place, respectively.

As Taruffi finished outside the points, he was unable to overtake Nino Farina in the Drivers' Championship standings. The Ferrari team monopolised the top three positions, with World Champion Alberto Ascari ahead of teammates Farina and Taruffi.

Entries

 — Carlo Dusio, named substitute driver for the #44 Cisitalia-BPM, took no part in the Grand Prix.

Classification

Qualifying

*Entries with a pink background failed to qualify for the race.

Race

Notes
 – Includes 0.5 points for shared fastest lap

Championship standings after the race 
Drivers' Championship standings

Note: Only the top five positions are included. Only the best 4 results counted towards the Championship. Numbers without parentheses are Championship points; numbers in parentheses are total points scored.

References

Italian Grand Prix
Italian Grand Prix
1952 in Italian motorsport
Ita